Barah Aana is a 2009 Indian black-comedy drama film written and directed by Raja Menon. The title refers to Barah (12) in Hindustani  (or ), 3/4 Rupees (75 paise), which was a unit of Indian currency before decimalisation. Barah Aana stars Naseeruddin Shah, Vijay Raaz, Arjun Mathur, and Tannishtha Chatterjee. The film depicts the lives of working-class Indians in a globalized milieu and how events spiral out of control when the characters try their hands at crime.

Plot
Set in today's Mumbai, Barah Aana revolves around three friends: Shukla, a driver, Yadav, a watchman, and Aman, a waiter. Shukla is an older man, stoic and steady. Yadav, in his 30s, is meek and something of a pushover at work but exhibits an underlying mischievous nature. Aman, is young, dynamic, and ambitious. In typical Mumbai fashion, the three are roommates, and the clash of their personalities regularly results in humorous, tongue-in-cheek banter.

Things take a turn when the watchman becomes prey to misfortune; his son gets typhoid and he has to arrange 5000 rupees for the tests. He goes door to door asking for money in the society he works for but no one helps him. Upset he sits near a road side stall where a few miscreants trouble him. In anger and frustration he hits one of them. He brings him home. After consultation with Shukla and Aman, Yadav decides to leave the man on road as he has not seen anyone's face. He goes out for six hours and in the same evening the three of them leave the man somewhere on a secluded road and Yadav calls the man's relative to pick the man from there. It is later revealed that Yadav has actually taken a ransom of 30 thousand rupees from that man's father in law to release him safely. The discovery changes his perspective, boosting his self-confidence enough to make him think that he has a new, low-risk way to make money. The next day Yadav tells the truth to Aman.  As Aman loves a Foreigner named Kate, he needs money to get settled with her. He joins Yadav's further plans to execute kidnapping in similar fashion. Both of them persuade Shukla to join them and Shukla shows initial reluctance but later joins them both. The three now embark on the journey of regularly kidnapping people to get smaller amounts as ransom.

As they get more and more mired in the spiral of events that follow, the three characters go through changes as they are pushed more and more against the wall.

Cast

See also
 Bollywood films of 2009

References

External links
 

2009 films
2000s crime comedy-drama films
2000s Hindi-language films
Indian crime comedy-drama films